Wildest Dreams is the seventh studio album by the Canadian progressive rock band Saga, originally released in 1987. It was their first album without original drummer Steve Negus and longtime keyboardist and vocalist Jim Gilmour.

Atlantic Records
The band signed with Atlantic Records after the Behaviour album and was seen as a promising act for Atlantic after having three solid and successful albums come out during the early and mid-1980s.  The record label spent a great deal of money promoting the band in the United States, a market that Saga had yet to penetrate.  Plans included a massive tour, a music video produced for the single "Only Time Will Tell" and on the production of the album itself.  Despite all of this, the album went largely unnoticed in the U.S. and was only released in Saga's more successful markets like Europe and their native Canada (#77 ).Only Time Will Tell reached #93 in Canada.

Rarity
Because of the limited scope of the original release and an issue with Atlantic refusing to surrender the rights of this album to the band, Wildest Dreams is considered by many fans to be the rarest album of Saga's repertoire to this day.  A re-release of the album was done around 2000 although this was before the band's remastering of all other albums in 2002, 2003, and 2004 and thus, made the album's release largely unnoticed by the fan base.  While the band has mentioned many times their desire to see the album released again for the fans, the band members have cited Atlantic Record's demand for a prohibitively large rights fee for the album.

Track listing

Personnel

Saga
 Michael Sadler – lead vocals, keyboards
 Jim Crichton – bass guitar, keyboards, synthaxe
 Ian Crichton – guitar, shadow midi guitar systems, synthaxe
 Curt Cress – drums, percussion

Production
 Brian Foraker –  engineer
 Gregory Fulginiti – mastering
 Keith Olsen  – producer

References

External links
 

1987 albums
Saga (band) albums
Atlantic Records albums
Albums produced by Keith Olsen